United States micropolitan statistical areas (μSA, where the initial Greek letter mu represents "micro-"), as defined by the Office of Management and Budget (OMB), are labor market and statistical areas in the United States centered on an urban cluster (urban area) with a population of at least 10,000 but fewer than 50,000 people. The micropolitan area designation was created in 2003.  Like the better-known metropolitan statistical areas, a micropolitan area is a geographic entity used for statistical purposes based on counties and county equivalents. The OMB has identified 543 micropolitan areas in the United States.

The term "micropolitan" gained currency in the 1990s to describe growing population centers in the United States that are removed from larger cities, in some cases by 100 miles (160 km) or more.

Micropolitan cities do not have the economic or political importance of large cities, but are nevertheless significant centers of population and production, drawing workers and shoppers from a wide local area. Because the designation is based on the core urban cluster's population and not on that of the whole area, some micropolitan areas are actually larger than some metropolitan areas. For example, the Ottawa, IL Micropolitan Statistical Area had a 2010 census population of 154,908. That would put its total population ahead of roughly 100 individual locations classified as a metropolitan statistical area in 2010. The largest of the areas, around Claremont and Lebanon, New Hampshire, had a population in excess of 218,000 in 2010; Claremont's population was only 13,355 in that year's census, and Lebanon's population was only 13,151.

United States 
The following sortable table lists the 543 μSAs of the incorporated United States (the 50 states and the District of Columbia) with the following information: 
The μSA rank by population as of July 1, 2021, as estimated by the United States Census Bureau
The μSA name as designated by the United States Office of Management and Budget
The μSA population as of July 1, 2021, as estimated by the United States Census Bureau
The μSA population as of April 1, 2020, as enumerated by the 2020 United States census
The percent μSA population change from April 1, 2020, to July 1, 2021
The combined statistical area (CSA) if it is designated and the μSA is a component

Puerto Rico
The following sortable table lists the 4 micropolitan statistical areas (μSAs) of Puerto Rico with the following information:
The μSA rank by population as of July 1, 2021, as estimated by the United States Census Bureau
The μSA name as designated by the United States Office of Management and Budget
The μSA population as of July 1, 2021, as estimated by the United States Census Bureau
The μSA population as of April 1, 2020, as enumerated by the 2020 United States census
The percent μSA population change from April 1, 2020, to July 1, 2021
The combined statistical area (CSA) if the MSA is a component

See also

United States of America
Outline of the United States
Index of United States-related articles
Demographics of the United States
United States Census Bureau
List of U.S. states and territories by population
List of metropolitan areas of the United States
List of United States cities by population
List of United States counties and county-equivalents

United States Office of Management and Budget
Statistical area (United States)
Combined statistical area (list)
Core-based statistical area (list)
Metropolitan statistical area (list)
Micropolitan statistical area (list)

References

External links

2010 United States Census
USCB population estimates
United States Office of Management and Budget

 
Demographics of the United States
United States Census Bureau geography
2003 introductions
2003 establishments in the United States